Anita Lily Pollitzer (October 31, 1894 – July 3, 1975) was an American photographer and suffragist.

Early life and education
Anita Lily Pollitzer was born October 31, 1894, in Charleston, South Carolina. Her parents were Clara Guinzburg Pollitzer, the daughter of an immigrant rabbi from Prague, and Gustave Pollitzer, who ran a cotton company at Charleston, South Carolina. She had two sisters, Carrie (born 1881) and Mabel (born 1885) and a brother, Richard.

Anita was raised Jewish and, as a young woman, taught Sabbath school in Charleston at Kahal Kadosh Beth Elohim. She was later a "nonobservant" Jew and relied upon her own personal strength, rather than reliance on religion. In response to her sister Mabel, who said in prayer, "God gave me mountains to climb and the strength to climb them," Anita's response was, "I don’t want God to give me mountains to climb…I want to find my own."

Anita graduated from Memminger High School in 1913 and left Charleston to study art at Teachers College, Columbia University.

Career

Artist 
Pollitzer may be best known for her friendship with Georgia O'Keeffe, whom she met at Columbia University. She is suspected of having a romantic relationship with O'Keeffe. They lived together for several years, and wrote love letters too each other. O'Keeffe mailed a set of charcoal drawings she made in 1915 to Pollitzer, who took them to Alfred Stieglitz at his 291 gallery early in 1916. Stieglitz found them to be the "purest, finest, sincerest things that had entered 291 in a long while", and in April, Stieglitz exhibited ten of her drawings at 291. This was the beginning of one of the most significant relationships among artists in the 20th century, Stieglitz promoted her career and later married O'Keeffe.

Pollitzer wrote a book entitled A Woman on Paper: Georgia O'Keeffe that contained letters that she exchanged with O'Keeffe since they attended Columbia University. The memoir not only contains her affection and love for O'Keeffe, but also anecdotes, family stories, and excerpts from their early letters. The early letters shared between the two mentioned questions of art and life and questions about the future. They remained friends until Pollitzer's death. Lynne Bundesen, who wrote a review of the book for The New York Times, said "it is a book that tells you that the voices of the most independent, far-seeing women of the times, the pioneers of women's rights and visions talked to each other as gushing, enthusiastic, eager and confused schoolgirls straight out of the Victorian era—as they may not have talked with their men." The book was published in 1988.

Suffragist 

Pollitzer was instrumental in the passage of the 19th Amendment and held positions of leadership in the National Woman's Party serving as National Chairman from 1945 until 1949.

Personal life
In December 1928, she married Elie Charlier Edson, Pete Seeger's uncle. Though she was in a relationship with O'Keeffe, it was not accepted at the time, hence, not public. She married Edson to maintain her place in society. The couple moved to New York City and lived in an apartment on West 115th St.

She died on July 3, 1975, in New York City.

References

External links 

 Anita Pollitzer, Library of Congress
 Anita Pollitzer biography and  papers, University of South Carolina Library
 Anita Pollitzer Family Papers at South Carolina Historical Society

Photographers from South Carolina
American people of Czech-Jewish descent
Artists from Charleston, South Carolina
Teachers College, Columbia University alumni
1894 births
1975 deaths
American suffragists
Jewish American artists
Jewish suffragists
20th-century American women photographers
20th-century American photographers
Secular Jews
20th-century American Jews